The 2014 Hounslow Council election took place on 22 May 2014 to elect members of Hounslow Council in London. This was on the same day as other local elections.

Results
Labour maintained control winning 49 seats. The Conservatives won 11 seats.

References

Hounslow
2014